Coast to Coast or Coast 2 Coast may refer to:

Films and television
 Coast to Coast (1980 film), a comedy film starring Dyan Cannon and Robert Blake
 Coast to Coast (1987 film), a comedy thriller film starring Lenny Henry and John Shea
 Coast to Coast (2003 film), a television film starring Richard Dreyfuss and Judy Davis
 Coast to Coast (UK TV series), the regional news programme of TVS, 1982–1992
 Coast to Coast (1998 TV series), a UK documentary series featuring Janet Street-Porter
 Coast to Coast, a television show starring Australian comedian Graham Kennedy
 Space Ghost Coast to Coast, an animated TV series that aired on Cartoon Network's Adult Swim
 Cavuto Coast to Coast (TV series), business news program hosted by Neil Cavuto

Music
 Coast to Coast (band), British rockabilly band
 Coast 2 Coast (B-Legit album), 2007
 Coast To Coast (Dave Clark Five album)
 Coast to Coast (Hit the Lights EP),
 Coast to Coast (McDonald's Jazz Band album), 1984
 Coast to Coast (Steve Morse Band album), 1992
 Coast to Coast (Cody Simpson EP)
 Coast to Coast (Westlife album)
 Coast to Coast: Overture and Beginners, a 1973 album by Faces
 "Coast 2 Coast", a song by Sam Adams from Boston's Boy
 "Coast to Coast", a song by Ducks Deluxe, 1973 (their first single)
 "Coast to Coast", a song by The Jesus and Mary Chain from Automatic
 "Coast to Coast", a song by The Scorpions from Lovedrive
 "Coast to Coast", a song by Elliott Smith from From a Basement on the Hill

Radio
 Coast to Coast AM, a syndicated AM talk radio show made famous by Art Bell
 Costas Coast to Coast, now known as Costas on the Radio
 Country Coast to Coast, a radio format, the former name of Best Country Today

Routes
 Coast to Coast Walk, a route devised by Alfred Wainwright to cross northern England
 Coast to Coast Cycle Route or Sea to Sea Cycle Route (C2C), crosses the Lake District and the Pennines in the north of England

Other uses
 Coast to Coast (race), a multisport event held annually in New Zealand
 Coast to Coast (restaurant), an American themed restaurant in England owned by Restaurant Group
 Coast to Coast Athletic Conference, an American college athletic conference in NCAA Division III
 Coast-to-coast goal, in Australian rules football
 Coast to Coast Hardware, a defunct chain of American hardware stores, now part of True Value
 Coast to Coast, a US telecom company, renamed Allegiance Telecom, then acquired by XO Communications
 OutRun 2006: Coast 2 Coast, a racing video game
 Coast to Coast Expansion Pack, for the video game Railroad Tycoon 3

See also
 Sea to Sea (disambiguation)
 Across America (disambiguation)
 Transamerica (disambiguation)
 Land's End to John o' Groats
 Contiguous United States